Sitapaila is a village and former Village Development Committee that is now part of Nagarjun Municipality in Province No. 3 of central Nepal. At the time of the 1991 Nepal census it had a population of 5,156 and had 1,008 households in it.

References

Populated places in Kathmandu District